Marius Sivertsen Broholm (born 26 December 2004) is a Norwegian footballer who plays for Norwegian club Rosenborg.

Club career

Broholm made his Rosenborg debut in July 2021 when he came on and scored against Melhus in the Norwegian Cup. 

In January 2022 Broholm signed his first professional contract with Rosenborg.

On 8 May 2022 Broholm made his league debut against Strømsgodset coming on in the 73rd minute.

Career statistics

Club

References

External links
 

2004 births
Living people
Norwegian footballers
Association football midfielders
Rosenborg BK players
Eliteserien players